Mathieu Ngirumpatse (born 1939) is a Rwandan politician, who was president of the MRND.

During a span of three months in 1994 approximately 800,000 ethnic Tutsis and moderate Hutus were killed in what the International Criminal Tribunal for Rwanda (ICTR) ruled was a "joint criminal enterprise" to exterminate Tutsis.
Ngirumpatse was sentenced to life imprisonment on 21 December 2011 for his role in the genocide.

References

Further reading

External links
 KAREMERA et al. (ICTR-98-44), International Criminal Tribuneral for Rwanda

1939 births
Hutu people
National Republican Movement for Democracy and Development politicians
People convicted by the International Criminal Tribunal for Rwanda
Rwandan people convicted of crimes against humanity
Rwandan prisoners and detainees
People from Rulindo District
Living people